This is a chronological list of ship commissionings in 2000.



See also 

2000
 Ship decommissionings
Ship